John Moore Malcolm (20 May 1917 – 14 January 2009) was a Scottish footballer, who played as a wing half in the Football League for Accrington Stanley and Tranmere Rovers.

References

External links

1917 births
2009 deaths
Tranmere Rovers F.C. players
Accrington Stanley F.C. (1891) players
English Football League players
Association football wing halves
Scottish footballers
Sportspeople from Clackmannanshire
Scottish Junior Football Association players